DYEC-TV, channel 22, was the flagship station of Philippine sports television network ABS-CBN Sports and Action, a fully owned subsidiary of ABS-CBN Corporation. Its transmitter and studios are located at the ABS-CBN Broadcasting Center, Lacson Street, Bacolod City and transmitter is located at Aquino Drive, Bacolod City.

On May 5, 2020, S+A Bacolod went off-air, together with ABS-CBN and MOR, due to cease-and-desist order from the National Telecommunications Commission after its legislative franchise expired the previous day.

References

See also
ABS-CBN
ABS-CBN Sports and Action
Studio 23 (the former name of ABS-CBN Sports and Action)
ABS-CBN Sports and Action stations

ABS-CBN Sports and Action stations
Television stations in Bacolod
Television channels and stations established in 1996
Television channels and stations disestablished in 2020